Infundibulops is a genus of sea snails, marine gastropod mollusks in the family Trochidae, the top snails.

This genus has become a synonym of Trochus (Infundibulops) Pilsbry, 1889 represented as Trochus Linnaeus, 1758.

Species
Species within the genus Infundibulops include:
 Infundibulops cariniferus (Beck in Reeve, 1842): synonym of Trochus cariniferus Reeve, 1842
 Infundibulops erythraeus (Brocchi, 1821): synonym of Trochus erithreus Brocchi, 1821
 Infundibulops kochii (Philippi, 1844): synonym of Trochus kochii Philippi, 1844

References

External links
 Pilsbry, H. A. (1889-1890). Manual of conchology, structural and systematic, with illustrations of the species. Ser. 1. Vol. 11: Trochidae, Stomatiidae, Pleurotomariidae, Haliotidae. pp 1-519, pls 1-67. Philadelphia, published by the Conchological Section, Academy of Natural Sciences.

Trochidae